Hélène Bellosta-Baylet (1946 – 19 August 2011) was a French historian of mathematics specializing in mathematics in medieval Islam.

Education and career
Bellosta was a student at the École normale supérieure de jeunes filles, and taught mathematics in the lycées for many years. She became a student of historian of mathematics Roshdi Rashed, earned a doctorate in epistemology and the history of science at Paris Diderot University, and, after four years of work at the French Institute of Arab Studies in Damascus (IFEAD), became a director of research for the French National Centre for Scientific Research (CNRS), associated with the Center for the History of Arab and Medieval Sciences and Philosophies at Paris Diderot University.

Books
With Rashed, Bellosta edited and translated the works of Apollonius of Perga in the book Apollonius de Perge, La section des droites selon des rapports, Commentaire historique et mathématique, édition et traduction du texte arabe (de Gruyter, 2010). They were also the coauthors of a book on Ibrahim ibn Sinan, Ibrāhīm ibn Sinān: Logique et géométrie au Xe siècle (Brill, 2000).

Recognition
Bellosta became a corresponding member of the International Academy of the History of Science in 2005.

References

External links
Bibliography of Bellosta's works, SPHERE, Paris Diderot University

1946 births
2011 deaths
20th-century French historians
French women historians
20th-century French mathematicians
French women mathematicians
French historians of mathematics
Paris Diderot University alumni
21st-century French historians
21st-century French mathematicians
Research directors of the French National Centre for Scientific Research